The Australian painted-snipe (Rostratula australis) is a medium-sized, long-billed, distinctively patterned wader.

Taxonomy
The distinctiveness of the Australian painted-snipe was recognised by John Gould in 1838 when he described and named it Rostratula australis.  However, it was subsequently lumped with the greater painted-snipe Rostratula benghalensis.  More recently it has been shown that the differences between these taxa warrant recognition at the species level.  Compared with the greater painted-snipe, the Australian painted-snipe:
 has a longer wing, shorter bill and shorter tarsus
 has a chocolate brown, rather than rufous, head and neck in the female
 has round, rather than flat and visually barred, spots on the tail (female) and upper wing-coverts (male)

Description
The head, neck and upper breast is chocolate brown (in the male, dark grey with a buff median stripe on the crown), fading to rufous in the centre of the hindneck and merging to dark, barred grey on the back.  There is a cream comma-shaped mark around the eye.  A white stripe on the side of the breast and over the shoulders is diagnostic.  The upperwing is grey (with buff spots in the male).  The lower breast and underbody are white.  Males are generally slightly smaller and less bright than females.  Juveniles are similar to adult males.  No call has been recorded.

The length ranges from 24 to 30 cm, the wingspan from 50 to 54 cm, the weight from 125 to 130 g.

Distribution and habitat
The Australian painted-snipe is endemic to Australia, though its distribution is patchy and its presence in any particular area is unpredictable.  A previous stronghold was the Riverina.  It frequents shallow, freshwater wetlands with a thick cover of low vegetation, disappearing when conditions become unsuitable.

Conservation
The species has declined drastically during the 20th century and is rare throughout its range.  Causes of the decline are ascribed to wetland drainage, river management and salinisation, as well as grazing and trampling of wetlands by stock.  Estimates of the total population range from a few hundred to a few thousand.  In Australia it is classified as being nationally threatened with a rating of Vulnerable. The IUCN recently split the species and treats it as endangered.

Behaviour

Diet
Wetland invertebrates such as worms, molluscs, insects and crustaceans; also seeds and other vegetation.

Breeding
Breeding painted-snipe prefer temporary but recently flooded wetlands, with low cover for shelter, shallow water and exposed mud for feeding, and small islands on which to nest.  They nest in ground scrapes or on mounds in water, lined with grass, leaves and twigs, where they lay clutches of 3-4 cream-coloured eggs marked with black streaks.  Incubation takes 15–16 days.  The young are precocial and nidifugous.

References 

 Lane, B.A.; & Rogers, D.I. (2000). The Australian Painted Snipe, Rostratula (benghalensis) australis: an Endangered species?. Stilt 36: 26-34
 Marchant, S.; Higgins, P.J.; & Davies, J.N. (eds). (1994). Handbook of Australian, New Zealand and Antarctic Birds.  Volume 2: Raptors to Lapwings. Oxford University Press: Melbourne.  
 Oring, Lewis W.; Rogers, Danny; Oring, Kay E.; & Tzaros, Chris. (2004). Snipes in peril. Wingspan 14(4): 10–15.
 Threatened Species Scientific Committee – advice to the Minister of Environment and Heritage on Australian Painted-snipe Downloaded 5 Feb 2007

Rostratula
Birds of Australia
Articles containing video clips
Birds described in 1838
Taxa named by John Gould